Anthony Robert Ierardi (born November 13, 1960) retired from military service as a United States Army lieutenant general on 1 August 2019. Over the course of his career, he served in a uniquely diverse set of Army and Joint command and staff assignments in operational and institutional units and organizations. Ierardi's concluding assignment was as the Joint Staff's Director for Force Structure, Resources, Assessments, J-8. Previously, he served as the Deputy Chief of Staff G-8 of the United States Army, and commanded the 1st Cavalry Division at Fort Hood Texas. He attended Washington and Lee University and Georgetown University and holds business administration and Master of Arts degrees.

References

1960 births
Living people
Recipients of the Defense Superior Service Medal
Recipients of the Legion of Merit
United States Army generals
United States Army personnel of the Gulf War
United States Army personnel of the War in Afghanistan (2001–2021)